Rinat Baibekov (born 1962, Kazan, Russia) comes from a family of artists of Tatar ancestry. He began sketching and painting at a very young age, attending full-time art courses alongside primary school. 
Baibekov studied art at the Kazan Art College, followed by the Kharkov Academy of Fine Art, where he majored in Public Art.

After living and working as an artist in St. Petersburg until 1990, Baibekov moved to Toronto, Canada. He returned to Europe in 1998, re-locating to Lowestoft, UK, where he paints and exhibits to the present day.

Artist’s statement

My dialogue with the world is a visual one. The universe is already created for us with all its beauty and wonders. As a visual artist I want to reveal and interpret the inter-relationships between all that is already there yet through my eyes. Humans and animals, plants and music, philosophy and myth are all inter-relationships I illustrate in my work.

Utilising knowledge and experience, one can masterfully implement the rules of composition, proportion, colour, tone, different techniques, effects, style to be considered a professional artist, yet in the end remain but only a craftsman, of which there are many.To become a Creator - Artist in the bigger sense one must reach for something grander,beautiful new, something I am trying to do to this day."I take my inspiration from ancients, philosophies, theological ideas, all arts, history and people, as well as the grand teacher itself Nature. My father, also an artist, taught me that If you do not have a teacher, go to Mother Nature.

Overview

Working predominately in the medium of acrylic paint, Baibekov's art is loosely associated with Surrealist art; his wide and varied work includes portraiture.

Exhibitions

2019

Fernini 20th Annual Winter Show, Lowestoft November - January 2020

2016Metamorphosis'', Resource for London, Holloway Road, London. UK October 1–2.

2015

Group Show, The Upstairs Gallery, Beccles,  UK

Group Show, Ferini Gallery Lowestoft, UK

Group Show, Moscow. Russia

2014

Group Show, Outside The Square Gallery, Margate

Group Show, Outside The Square Gallery, Margate, UK

Group Show, The Upstairs Gallery, Beccles, UK

2013

Group Show, Outside The Square Gallery, Margate, UK

Group Show, The Upstairs Gallery, Beccles, UK

Group Show, Moscow   Russia

Group Show, Art Centre Gallery, Lowestoft, UK

2012

Group Show, Outside The Square Gallery, Margate, UK

Group Show, The Upstairs Gallery, Beccles, UK

Solo Exhibition, Outside The Square Gallery, Margate, UK

Group Show, Moscow   Russia

Group Show, Art Centre Gallery, Lowestoft.UK

2011

Group Show, Outside The Square Gallery, Margate, UK

Solo Exhibition, Outside The Square Gallery, Margate, UK

Group Show, The Upstairs Gallery, Beccles, UK

Group Show, Art Centre Gallery, Lowestoft, UK

Group Show, Moscow, Russia

2010

Group Show, Outside The Square Gallery, Margate, UK

Group Show, The Upstairs Gallery, Beccles, UK

Group Show,  Moscow, Russia

CDS Leys School Annual Exhibition, Cambridge, UK

CDS Annual Exhibition, Guild Hall, Cambridge, UK

2009

CDS Leys School Annual Exhibition, Cambridge,UK

CDS Annual Exhibition, Guild Hall, Cambridge

UK Group Show, Gamlingay, Bedfordshire

Solo Exhibition, "Common Faces", Interurban Gallery, Vancouver,Canada

Solo Exhibition, Swan Gallery, Beccles, UK

2008

Group Show, Art at the Chapel, Cambridge, UK

CDS Annual Exhibition, Guild Hall, Cambridge,UK

CDS Annual Exhibition, Guild Hall, Cambridge, UK

Solo Exhibition, Swan Gallery, Beccles, UK

Solo Exhibition, Kapitza House, Cambridge, UK

Solo Exhibition, Open studio, Cambridge, UK

2007

CDS Annual Exhibition, Guild Hall, Cambridge, UK

CDS Annual Exhibition, Guild Hall, Cambridge,UK

Solo Exhibition, Kapitza House, Cambridge, UK

Solo Exhibition, Open studio, Cambridge, UK

2006

Group Show, Museum of Contemporary Art, Kazan                                              Russia

Group Show, The Michaelhouse Centre, Cambridge                                             UK

Solo Exhibition, St.John's College, Cambridge                                                      UK

CDS Annual Exhibition, Guild Hall, Cambridge                                                      UK

CDS Annual Exhibition, Guild Hall, Cambridge                                                      UK

2005

Group Show, The Michaelhouse Centre, Cambridge                                             UK

CDS Annual Exhibition, Guild Hall, Cambridge                                                      UK

CDS Annual Exhibition, Guild Hall, Cambridge                                                      UK

Group Show, Art Fair, London                                                                                UK

2004

Solo Exhibition, St.John's College, Cambridge                                                      UK

CDS Annual Exhibition, Guild Hall, Cambridge                                                      UK

CDS Annual Exhibition, Guild Hall, Cambridge                                                      UK

2003

Solo Exhibition, Mondo Bizzarro Gallery, Bologna                                                  Italy

Solo Exhibition, Open studio, Cambridge                                                                UK

2002

Solo Exhibition, "Eros Materia", Mondo Bizzarro Gallery, Bologna                        Italy

2001

Solo Exhibition, Gallery FortySeven, London                                                        UK

2000

Solo Exhibition, Ashcroft Gallery, London

1999

Solo Exhibition, Paul Hawkins Gallery, London                                                      UK

1998

Solo Exhibition, Apollo Gallery, London

Solo Exhibition, The Heifer Gallery, London

Solo Exhibition, Conkers Gallery, London

1997

Solo Exhibition, See Gallery, Toronto                                                                    Canada

Solo Exhibition, Baibekov Art Studio,Toronto                                                        Canada

1996

Solo Exhibition, Sobot Gallery, Toronto,                                                                 Canada

Solo Exhibition, Baibekov Art Studio, Toronto,                                                       Canada

1995

Solo Exhibition, Baibekov Art Studio, Toronto,                                                       Canada

1994

Solo Exhibition, Baibekov Art Studio, Toronto,                                                       Canada

Solo Exhibition, Sodarco Gallery, Montreal                                                           Canada

1993

Solo Exhibition, Baibekov Art Studio, Toronto                                                       Canada

Group Show,  Ontario Place, Toronto                                                                    Canada

1992

Solo Exhibition, Theodore Museum of Art, Toronto                                               Canada

Solo Exhibition, Baibekov Art Studio, Toronto                                                       Canada

1991

Solo Exhibition, French Consulate, Toronto                                                          Canada

1990

Solo Exhibition, Kostaki Auction House, Toronto

Canada Group Show, Exhibition of Free Contemporary Artists, St.Petersburg                  Russia

1989

Solo Exhibition, FCRA, Kikini Palati, St.Petersburg                                               Russia

Group Show, FCRA, UNESCO Headquarters, Paris,                                             France

Group Show, Exhibition of Free Contemporary Artists, St.Petersburg, Russia   Group Show,

FCRA, Cologne-Munich                                                                  Germany

1988

Group Exhibition, Society of Free Contemporary Artists, St.Petersburg                Russia

Solo Exhibition, Nevsky Prospect Gallery, St.Petersburg                                      Russia

1987

Group Exhibition, Society of Free Contemporary Artists, St.Petersburg,                 Russia

Solo Exhibition, Nevsky Prospect Gallery, St.Petersburg                                       Russia

Group Show, Arbat Gallery, Moscow. Russia

References

Canadian surrealist artists
1962 births
Living people
People of Tatar descent
Artists from Kazan